Cameraria varii is a moth of the family Gracillariidae. It is found in South Africa. The habitat consists of the urban area of the city of Pretoria.

The forewing ground colour is ochreous. The hindwings are whitish with a silver shine and with a long whitish pale grey fringe slightly darker shade than the hindwing. Adults are on wing from late October to early November.

Etymology
The species is named in honour of Dr. Lajos Vári.

References

Endemic moths of South Africa
Moths described in 2012
varii

Taxa named by Jurate de Prins